Pol-e Dokhtar  (meaning Bridge of the Daughter, also Romanized as  Pol Dokhtar   and   Pul-i-Dukhtar ) is a city in and capital of Pol-e Dokhtar County, Lorestan Province, Iran. At the 2006 census, its population was 22,558, in 5,131 families.

Pol-e-Dokhtar is approximately 100 kilometres from Khorramabad, the provincial capital.  Just north of the city resides the remains of an ancient bridge, which, along with others in this area, has been submitted as a potential UNESCO World Heritage site.

Monuments

Kalmakareh Cave
In 1989 a unique treasure in the cave was discovered Kalmakareh Cave, according to Mehr news agency, it can take into account the six treasures of the ancient world.

Kogan Cave
Cogan cave is located in ashkanian East Poldokhtar city.

References

External links
 
 Iran Travel, Tourism and Touring Organization
 Pol-e-Dokhtar

Cities in Lorestan Province
Towns and villages in Pol-e Dokhtar County